Lana Wilson is an American filmmaker. She directed the feature documentaries After Tiller, The Departure, and Miss Americana. The first two films were nominated for the Independent Spirit Award for Best Documentary.

Life and career
Originally from Kirkland, Washington, Wilson graduated from Lake Washington High School in 2001.

She received a BA from Wesleyan University, where she majored in film studies and dance. Before becoming a director, Wilson was the film and dance curator for Performa, the New York biennial of new visual art performance.

Wilson's first film After Tiller follows the four most-targeted abortion providers in the country. It premiered at the Sundance Film Festival in 2013 and was picked up by arthouse distributor Oscilloscope Laboratories. The film was released in theaters in fall 2013, and received critical acclaim for taking a complex and compassionate look at one of the most challenging issues of our time. It holds a 95% positive "Certified Fresh" rating on Rotten Tomatoes, with the consensus, "After Tiller applies empathy, honesty, and graceful understatement to a discussion that all too often lacks them all."

In 2015 After Tiller won the News and Documentary Emmy Award for Best Documentary. It was also nominated for the Independent Spirit Award for Best Documentary, four Cinema Eye Honors, a Satellite Award, and the Ridenhour Prize, and was named one of the Top Five Documentaries of the Year by the National Board of Review.

Wilson's second film, The Departure, is about a Japanese punk rocker-turned-Buddhist priest who works to prevent suicide in Japan. In the film the priest confronts his own mortality. The Departure premiered at the 2017 Tribeca Film Festival and was picked up by distributor FilmRise. In fall 2017 it was released in US theaters to extensive critical acclaim. In 2018, it was nominated for the Independent Spirit Award for Best Documentary. The Washington Post wrote that the film "explores life’s toughest and most transcendent moments with tenderness, honesty, and care." The San Francisco Chronicle called it "a beautiful meditation on the value of life" and "a work of art." On review aggregator Rotten Tomatoes the film holds a 100% approval rating. On Metacritic, the film has a weighted average score of 85 out of 100, indicating "universal acclaim."

Wilson's third documentary, Miss Americana, follows American singer-songwriter Taylor Swift and her life over the course of several years of her career. After premiering at the 2020 Sundance Film Festival, the film received critical praise and a standing ovation from the audience. Miss Americana is described as an "intimate", "empowering", "genuine" and "funny" documentary by critics, who complimented Wilson's direction, portraying Swift's creative process and discussions on issues such as eating disorder, self esteem and sexual assault. It became the highest-rated Netflix-original biographical documentary film in IMDb history. On review aggregator website Rotten Tomatoes, the film has a "certified fresh" approval rating of 93% based on 72 reviews, with an average rating of 7.59/10. On Metacritic, it has a weighted average score of 65 out of 100, based on 23 critics, indicating "generally favorable reviews". The film is a New York Times "Critic's Pick" and an IndieWire "Critic's Pick."

Wesley Morris of The New York Times described Miss Americana as "85 minutes of translucence" with Swift, stating that she is "self-critical, grown up and ready, perhaps, to deliver a message beyond the music". David Ehrlich of IndieWire called the film "Thrilling" and "enormously winsome," writing that "its power is in watching someone who stands astride the world gradually realize that their art is the only thing they can control." Hannah Woodhead of Little White Lies wrote that the film offers "unprecedented access to the notoriously private singer and her dizzying world" through "interviews, studio footage, home videos and concert recordings". In a 2020 interview with FF2 Media, Wilson herself recalls that as a storyteller, her favorite thing to film was Swift's creative process. Wilson stated that the toughest part of the project was building trust with Swift, as she hadn't been interviewed in three years

Wilson's short-form web series, A Cure for Fear, played at South by Southwest and the Camden International Film Festival and was nominated for an International Documentary Association Award for Best Short-Form Series.

Wilson is a MacDowell Fellow and a visiting assistant professor at Pratt Institute.

Profiling Wilson in the inaugural issue, Doxx magazine says that Wilson "asks philosophical questions about life and death, and observes the struggles that may yield their elusive answers."

Influences
Wilson has cited many influences for her work, including Rainer Werner Fassbinder, Frederick Wiseman, Lixin Fan, Heddy Honigmann, and William Wyler. She has said that all filmmakers should see Stan Brakhage's Dog Star Man and Jacques Tati's Playtime.

Filmography

Feature films

Series
A Cure for Fear (director/producer) – a 4-episode short-form series for First Look Media's Topic, launched October 2018
National Geographic I Am Rebel documentary series premiere episode "Jacked" (writer/producer) – concerning the Southern Airways Flight 49 highjacking, aired June 5, 2016

Awards
After Tiller won a News & Documentary Emmy Award for Best Documentary in September, 2015. Wilson was awarded the "Champion of Choice Award" by NARAL Pro-Choice America in 2014 for her work on the film.

Wilson was selected by Sundance Institute as a Women at Sundance Fellow in 2017.

References

External links

Lana Wilson interview CFRO-FM, Vancouver: October 11, 2017 (audio starts at 33:45)

Film directors from Washington (state)
People from Kirkland, Washington
Living people
1983 births
American documentary film directors
American documentary film producers
News & Documentary Emmy Award winners
Film producers from Washington (state)
American women documentary filmmakers
21st-century American women